Rodnei Francisco de Lima (born 11 September 1985), commonly known as Rodnei, is a Brazilian professional footballer who plays as a centre-back for Austrian club SV Anthering.

Career 
Rodnei made his Bundesliga debut for Hertha on 14 February 2009 against Bayern Munich, a match that Hertha won, leaving them in first place in the Bundesliga.

On 25 July 2009, Rodnei was loaned to 1. FC Kaiserslautern until the end of the 2009–10 season. In 2012, he went on to FC Red Bull Salzburg in the Austrian Bundesliga.

In February 2015, Rodnei joined RB Leipzig on loan. Ahead of the 2015–16 season he signed a contract with 2. Bundesliga club 1860 Munich. His contract was terminated in 2017.

References

External links
 
 Rodnei at Jagiellonia Białystok 

1985 births
Living people
Footballers from São Paulo
Brazilian footballers
Brazilian expatriate footballers
Association football defenders
Clube Atlético Juventus players
FC Vilnius players
Jagiellonia Białystok players
Hertha BSC players
1. FC Kaiserslautern players
FC Red Bull Salzburg players
RB Leipzig players
TSV 1860 Munich players
FC Blau-Weiß Linz players
Bundesliga players
2. Bundesliga players
Ekstraklasa players
Austrian Football Bundesliga players
2. Liga (Austria) players
A Lyga players
Brazilian expatriate sportspeople in Germany
Brazilian expatriate sportspeople in Poland
Brazilian expatriate sportspeople in Lithuania
Brazilian expatriate sportspeople in Austria
Expatriate footballers in Germany
Expatriate footballers in Poland
Expatriate footballers in Lithuania
Expatriate footballers in Austria